Johannes or Jan Luyken (April 16, 1649 – April 5, 1712) was a Dutch poet, illustrator, and engraver.

Biography

He was born and died in Amsterdam, where he learned engraving from his father Kaspar Luyken. He married at 19 and had several children, including renowned engraver Kasparus Luiken. At age 26 Luyken converted to the Mennonite church, which inspired him to write moralistic poetry.

Works
Luyken illustrated the 1685 edition of the Martyrs Mirror with 104 copper etchings. Thirty of these plates survive and were part of The Mirror of the Martyrs exhibit.

He also published Het Menselyk Bedryf ("The Book of Trades") in 1694, which contains numerous engravings of 17th-century trades by Luiken and his son Caspar (Caspaares).

Cultural references
Joris-Karl Huysmans' anti-hero Des Esseintes in À rebours was an admirer of Luyken's engravings and had prints from his Religious Persecutions hung in his boudoir. He described them as "a collection of appalling plates displaying all the tortures which religious fanaticism has invented." Des Esseintes was enthralled not just by Luyken's graphic depictions but his ability to reconstruct times and places in his works.

Gallery

Notes

External links

 
 

1649 births
1712 deaths
17th-century Dutch poets
Dutch male poets
Dutch illustrators
Engravers from Amsterdam
Writers from Amsterdam
Dutch Golden Age printmakers
Dutch Mennonites
Mennonite artists
Mennonite writers
Mennonite poets
Catholic engravers